The American River Grange Hall in Rancho Cordova, California, is an 1882 wooden Grange Hall building. The American River Grange was incorporated in January 1873 and met in Fifteen Mile House until having this building built.

As of 1996, the American River Grange Hall has been in continuous use ever since and is the oldest of eight Granges active in Sacramento County, California.

It was listed on the National Register of Historic Places in 1996.

See also
California Historical Landmarks in Sacramento County, California
The National Grange of the Order of Patrons of Husbandry
National Register of Historic Places listings in Sacramento County, California

References

External links

Grange organizations and buildings in California
Buildings and structures in Sacramento County, California
Grange buildings on the National Register of Historic Places
Clubhouses on the National Register of Historic Places in California
National Register of Historic Places in Sacramento County, California
1882 establishments in California
Rancho Cordova, California